Men Behaving Badly is an American sitcom television series that ran on NBC from September 18, 1996, to December 17, 1997. It is based on the earlier British sitcom of the same name.

Synopsis
Set in Indianapolis, Indiana, the show starred Rob Schneider, Ron Eldard, and Justine Bateman. Kevin (Eldard) and Jamie (Schneider) were college buddies sharing an apartment and living out a second childhood, much to the chagrin of Kevin's girlfriend Sarah (Bateman). Brenda (Dina Spybey) was an upstairs neighbor that Jamie flirted with.

Eldard and Bateman left after the first season amid rumors that they clashed with Schneider and the show's producers. They were replaced by Ken Marino and Jenica Bergere, and Spybey was promoted from recurring to series regular.

Cast
 Rob Schneider as Jamie Coleman
 Ron Eldard as Kevin Murphy (season 1)
 Justine Bateman as Sarah Stretten (season 1)
 Dina Spybey as Brenda Mikowski
 Julia Campbell as Cherie Miller (season 1)
 Ken Marino as Steve (season 2)
 Jenica Bergere as Katie (season 2)

Justine Bateman and Ron Eldard left after season one due to salary demands.

Reception
Reviewers found the show's content to be too risqué, pushing its brand of gross-out humor beyond all but the raciest cable shows of the day.
 The first season ran for 22 episodes. Altogether 13 episodes were completed for the second season, albeit with Schneider as the sole original member in the main cast. Only six of those completed episodes ever aired during the initial run because of dropping ratings and steep competition from CBS's Top 10 hit Touched by an Angel, Fox's Top 20 hit The Simpsons, and ABC's Top 40 hit The Wonderful World of Disney.

Home media
The entire series of 35 episodes was released as a Region 1 DVD box set in February 2007.

Episodes

Season 1 (1996–97)

Season 2 (1997)

References

External links
 
 

1996 American television series debuts
1997 American television series endings
1990s American sitcoms
American television series based on British television series
English-language television shows
NBC original programming
Television series by Carsey-Werner Productions
Television shows set in Indianapolis